The 2014–15 Incarnate Word Cardinals women's basketball team represented the University of the Incarnate Word during the 2014–15 NCAA Division I women's basketball season. The Cardinals, led by first year head coach Kate Henderson, played their home games at McDermott Convocation Center. They are members of the Southland Conference.

The 2014–15 season is year 2 of a 4-year transitional period for Incarnate Word from D2 to D1. In years 2–4 Incarnate Word is classified as a D1 school for scheduling purposes. They played a full conference schedule, and they could win the regular season conference title. However Incarnate Word cannot participate in the conference tourney until the 2017–18 season, at which time they will also be able to enter the NCAA tournament, should they win the conference. Incarnate Word is eligible to participate in the WBI or WNIT should they be invited.

Audio Streaming
All Incarnate Word games were broadcast on KUIW Radio, and they provided streaming of all non-televised home games shown via UIW TV.

Roster

Schedule

|-
!colspan=12 style="background:#FF0000; color:#000000;"| Out of Conference Schedule

|-
!colspan=12 style="background:#FF0000; color:#000000;"| Southland Conference Schedule

See also
 2014–15 Incarnate Word Cardinals men's basketball team

References

Incarnate Word Cardinals women's basketball seasons
Incarnate Word
Incarnate Word Cardinals basketball
Incarnate Word Cardinals basketball